Ashraful Hussain (born 10 January 1994) is an Indian politician who is serving as a Member of Assam Legislative Assembly representing the All India United Democratic Front from the Chenga Assembly constituency in the 2021 Assam Legislative Assembly election.

He is the youngest Member of the Legislative Assembly (India) of Assam Legislative Assembly (2021) aged 27, hailing from Chenga (Vidhan Sabha constituency) of lower Assam. He has contested from All India United Democratic Front ticket and was elected with a margin of more than 50,000 votes. His father is a small farmer and shopkeeper. He comes from a family with no political background. He emerged as a strong voice in the Chenga (Vidhan Sabha constituency) in Assam 2021 Election for the rights of D voter and National Register of Citizens (NRC). He graduated from Indira Gandhi National Open University with a Bachelors degree in Social Work (BSW). He was a journalist in various News Organisations like Pratidin Time etc. He was a member of the campaign called Karwan-e-Mohabbat. He was also a member of Sambidhan Sevak. He fought for the land rights of the displaced people from the flood erosion of Brahmaputra River. He was involved in various relief programmes in seasonal flood of Assam and during the COVID-19 lockdown in India.

Early life and education 

He was born in a Muslim family at Haripur village, Barpeta. His father was a small farmer and shopkeeper. His mother is a Anowara Khatun housewife. He passed his High School Leaving Certificate examinations from Tarabari Higher Secondary School. His senior secondary school was Ratnadip Junior College. He then earned a diploma in Jr. Engineering from CIPET, Guwahati. Later on he graduated from Indira Gandhi National Open University in Bachelor in Social Work.

Social Work And Activism 

From 2014 to 2016 he was in Pune employed in the corporate sector. He then came to Assam and started indulging in solving the problems of citizenship crisis, land pattas, poverty, flood erosion etc. He also did freelance journaling in esteemed news organisations of the state.

In an island of Baksa district, before the 2014 Indian general election, he worked, as a journalist and reported the killing of 40 children and women by Bodo Militants. In 2017, he started traveling across the country with his colleagues and visited the homes of people bereaved by mob lynching and hate violence. They called the campaign as Karwan-e-Mohabbat or Caravan of Love. The journey of the Karwan began in Assam 2017, in a small village of Nagaon in which two young boys were killed by mob lynching. He then travelled to Jharkhand, Delhi, Mewat, Uttar Pradesh, Rajasthan, Gujarat and Karnataka. The Karwan continued its journeys for three years, until the COVID-19 lockdown in India.

He was a member of Sambidhan Sevak, an initiative started by Harsh Mander (social worker and author) to spread awareness about the Indian constitution among the people in lower Assam. During the 2019 floods, Ashraful and members from the Sambidhan Sevak worked to distribute relief in many villages in the Barpeta district. He also joined Satra Mukti Sangram Samiti (SMSS).

When the process of National Register of Citizens began in Assam by the order of Supreme Court, he focused on helping illiterate people along with his colleagues in filling National Register of Citizens forms and assisting them travelling long distances at the time of hearing. They called themselves as Samvidhan Saathis or Friends of the Constitution.

He also worked for the land rights of the people of Chenga (Vidhan Sabha constituency). He served the people who are affected by the floods of Brahmaputra river and volunteered the displaced people from the flood erosion. He channelised reliefs from various sources and organisations and aided things for the people during the COVID-19 lockdown in India in Barpeta district of Assam. He volunteered actively in the distribution of amenities like masks, sanitizers, food, medicines and sanitary pads.

Poetry

History of Miya 

Assam consists of many Tribes (Jonogusthi). For example – Ahom, Kachari, Bodo, Garo, Rabha, Koch, Cha Jonogusthi (Tea Tribe), Chutia, Dimasa, Moran, Motak etc. In the Colonial British Government Period, to increase land productivity, Bengali Muslim cultivators were encouraged to settle in Assam that began in 1901 from Mymensingh of Bengal Province. Many also migrated from the modern-day Rangpur, Rajshahi, Pabna, Bogra divisions of East Bengal. These people settled in the Brahmaputra Valley during 1857 to 1942 and the movement has continued till 1947.  These East Bengal Origin Muslims are now known as various names i.e, Choruwa, Pamua, Mymensinghia, Na-Asomiya, Miya etc. After the partition of India, as directed by the Muslim League leadership, the community adopted Assamese as their native language and gave up their Bengali linguistic identity. Later on they adopted the assamese culture and was named as Na-asamiya (Neo-Assamese).

Miya Poetry 

"Miya poetry is not a tool for division - it should be a bridge of unity between the mainstream Assamese society and the Miya people."- Jiten Bezboruan

In the recent times, some scholars of the community are trying to uplift the Na-asamiya society through poems. Since, correct naming of the community is still not done yet in true sense, the poetic establishment's aim is to reclaim the word "Miya", which is often used derogatorily by non-muslims. They chose topics like child marriage, poverty, population spike, illiteracy as their subject. The collection of these poems are named as Miya poetry. This started with the publication of "Write Down, I am a Miya" by Hafiz Ahmed. Recently, due to misunderstandings, Miya poetry has created controversy, especially among the indigenous people of Assam. Some complaints are raised by media and to the police that such type of poetry is "anti-Assamese" even though majority of the poems are written in Assamese language. Ashraful was one of the poets. His poem, "My Mother’s Name is D-Voter" became very popular.

Assam Election 2021 

 
In 2021 Assam Legislative Assembly election, Ashraful's party AIUDF was in alliance with Congress, Bodoland People's Front (BPF) and CPI-M named Mahajut. Mahajut lost against Mitrojut of BJP.

He defeated the incumbent Sukur Ali Ahmed who was a four times elected legislator of Chenga (Vidhan Sabha constituency) and served as a minister in the Tarun Gogoi-led state government. Sukur Ali of Indian National Congress (INC) got 23357 votes and Rabiul Hussain of Asom Gana Parishad (AGP) got 23373 votes. Ashraful Hussain got 75312 votes and won with a margin of 51939 votes. He secured 58.83% of the votes and became the youngest legislator of Assam Legislative Assembly 2021.

Personal life 
Ashraful Hussain married Rehna Sultana on 27 May 2021. Sultana is an Assistant Professor at Sibsagar Girls' College.

References

External links
 Scroll.in Article 2021
 Indianexpress.in Article 2021
 Thewire.in Article 2021
 Sentinelassam.com Article 2021
 Caravanmagazine.in Article 2021
 Eastmojo.com Article 2021

Members of the Assam Legislative Assembly
Living people
1994 births
Assam politicians
All India United Democratic Front politicians
People from Barpeta district